Katherine Anne Paye (born March 6, 1974) is a former collegiate and professional basketball player. She is currently the women's basketball associate head coach at Stanford University.

Early life and college career
Paye was born at the medical center of Stanford University's hospital, and was raised in Woodside, California in a family of Stanford student-athletes.  Both of her parents, her sister and brother all went to the school. Her father was a running back for Stanford's football team while her brother John was a guard for Stanford's basketball team and quarterback for the Cardinal in the mid-1980s, and later was her basketball coach at Menlo School. At Menlo, Kate led the team to three consecutive California Interscholastic Federation Division V state basketball championships from 1989 to 1991.

After high school, she was recruited by (and turned down) Harvard University, Princeton University and Dartmouth College. Stanford never recruited her, so Paye attended its women's basketball team training camp as a walk-on and tried out. She was accepted and won a spot as a point guard on the team.

In her freshman year in 1992, she played on Stanford's 1992 championship team and earned a scholarship for the following year.

She graduated in 1995 with a Bachelor of Arts degree in political science.

ABL and WNBA 
In 1996, Paye began her professional basketball career with the Seattle Reign in the American Basketball League (ABL) for three seasons until the league folded.

She later joined the Women's National Basketball Association (WNBA) in 2000, and played for the Minnesota Lynx for two seasons.  After she was waived by Lynx in May 2002, she signed a free agent contract with the Seattle Storm and played for them in the 2002 season.

During her WNBA career, she spent the offseason pursuing a JD/MBA degree. And in the Spring of 2003, she graduated from Stanford Law School with a Juris Doctor and the Stanford Graduate School of Business with a Masters in Business Administration.

WNBA career statistics

Regular season

|-
| align="left" | 2000
| align="left" | Minnesota
| 28 || 12 || 14.6 || .328 || .293 || .667 || 1.1 || 1.4 || 0.3 || 0.2 || 1.0 || 2.0
|-
| align="left" | 2001
| align="left" | Minnesota
| 32 || 16 || 20.4 || .385 || .357 || .688 || 1.9 || 3.0 || 0.7 || 0.0 || 1.4 || 2.8
|-
| align="left" | 2002
| align="left" | Seattle
| 19 || 0 || 6.0 || .368 || .375 || .500 || 0.4 || 0.3 || 0.2 || 0.0 || 0.4 || 1.1
|-
| align="left" | Career
| align="left" | 3 years, 2 teams
| 79 || 28 || 14.9 || .361 || .336 || .667 || 1.2 || 1.8 || 0.4 || 0.1 || 1.0 ||2.1

Coaching career 
She started her coaching career in 1995, after graduating from Stanford, to briefly serve as an assistant coach at San Diego State University. But she left the following year to embark upon her playing career in the ABL.

After her playing career ended, Paye returned to coaching when she was hired as a women's basketball assistant coach and recruiting coordinator at Pepperdine University for the 2004-2005 season.

In May 2005, Paye returned as an assistant coach for the San Diego State University Aztecs. Her duties included coaching the point guards and perimeter players, as well as scouting opposing teams and being involved with the Aztecs' recruitment efforts.

In June 2007, Paye returned to Stanford as an assistant coach.

References

External links
Stanford University Coaching Profile
WNBA Player Profile
2002 WNBA Article - "Staying In The Game: Kate Paye"

1974 births
Living people
American women's basketball players
American women's basketball coaches
Basketball players from California
Minnesota Lynx players
Pepperdine Waves women's basketball coaches
Seattle Reign (basketball) players
Seattle Storm players
Shooting guards
Stanford Cardinal women's basketball coaches
Stanford Cardinal women's basketball players
Stanford Graduate School of Business alumni
Stanford Law School alumni
People from Woodside, California